This is a list of museums in Isle of Man.
Manx National Heritage  runs the following museums:
Castle Rushen, Castletown
Cregneash Folk Village, Cregneash
Grove Museum, Ramsey
House of Manannan, Peel
The Great Laxey Wheel & Mines Trail, Laxey Wheel, Laxey
Manx Museum, Douglas
The Nautical Museum, Castletown
The Old Grammar School, Castletown
The Old House of Keys, Castletown
Peel Castle, Peel
Rushen Abbey, Ballasalla
Sound Centre, Calf Sound, near Cregneash
Niarbyl, Dalby Niarbyl

The Isle of Man Government Department of Infrastructure runs:
 Isle of Man Railway Museum

Volunteers from the Manx Transport Trust run:
 Jurby Transport Museum

Museums

Isle of Man
Museums
Isle of Man
Museums